Wajihuddin's Tomb or Hazrat Wajihuddin Dargah, is a tomb of Sufi saint Wajihuddin Alvi in Khanpur area of Ahmedabad, India.

History and architecture
Wajihuddin Alvi was an Islamic scholar and Sufi of Shattari tradition. Born in Champaner, he moved to Ahmedabad where he received and later imparted knowledge in Islamic studies.  He was initiated in Shattari tradition by Mohammed Ghaus Gwaliori. He died in Ahmedabad in 1580 CE (988 H.).

The tomb dedicated to him was built by his disciple Syed Murtuza Khan Bukhari, the eleventh (1606-1609) governor of Ahmedabad during reign of Jahangir. The central dome is much higher than several other domes surrounding it. The walls have perforated stone windows. There is an underground reservoir and a cistern said to have healing power and not to have been dry ever.

References 

Tombs in Ahmedabad
Indo-Islamic architecture
Buildings and structures completed in the 1610s